An anoscopy is an examination using a small, rigid, tubular instrument called an anoscope (also called an anal speculum).  This is inserted a few inches into the anus in order to evaluate problems of the anal canal. Anoscopy is used to diagnose hemorrhoids, anal fissures (tears in the lining of the anus), and some cancers.

Process
This test is usually done in a doctor's office. The patient is required to remove their underwear, and must either lie on their side on top of an examining table, with their knees bent up towards the chest, or bend forward over the table. The anoscope is 3 to 4 inches long and the width of an average-to-large bowel movement. The doctor will coat the anoscope with a lubricant and then gently push it into the anus and rectum. The doctor may ask the patient to "bear down" or push as if they were going to have a bowel movement, and then relax. This helps the doctor insert the anoscope more easily and identify any bulges along the lining of the rectum.

By shining a light into this tube, the doctor will have a clear view of the lining of the lower rectum and anus. The anoscope is pulled out slowly once the test is finished.

The patient will feel pressure during the examination, and the anoscope will make one feel as if they were about to have a bowel movement. This is normal, however, and many patients do not feel pain from anoscopy.

Conditions visible to anoscopy
 Hemorrhoids
 Anal fissures
 Fistulas
 Abscesses
 Inflammation
 Perianal/rectal tumors
 Some types of rectal or mucosal prolapses
 Rectal cancer
 Other anorectal problems
Anoscopy will permit biopsies to be taken, and is used when ligating prolapsed hemorrhoids. It is used in the treatment of warts produced by HPV.

The procedure is done on an outpatient basis.

References

 Harvard Health Publications page

Colorectal surgery
Endoscopy
Digestive system procedures